The United Nations Educational, Scientific and Cultural Organization (UNESCO) World Heritage Sites are places of importance to cultural or natural heritage as described in the UNESCO World Heritage Convention, established in 1972. Iraq accepted the convention on 5 March 1974, making its historical sites eligible for inclusion on the list; as of 2019, six sites in Iraq are included.

The first site in Iraq, Hatra, was inscribed on the list at the 9th Session of the World Heritage Committee, held in Paris, France in 1985. Ashur (Qal'at Sherqat) was inscribed in 2003 as the second site, followed by Samarra Archaeological City in 2007. Erbil Citadel and The Ahwar of Southern Iraq were added to the list in 2014 and 2016, respectively, the latter being Iraq's first mixed property. Later on, Babylon was added in 2019.

Ashur (Qal'at Sherqat) was added to the list in 2003, the same year it was inscribed as a World Heritage Site, due to concerns that a dam project might partially flood the site; while the project has since been put on hold, the site remains on the list as a result of the lack of protection. Similarly, Samarra Archaeological City was put on the list simultaneously with its World Heritage Site inscription in 2007, as authorities have been unable to adequately manage and conserve the site since the outbreak of the Iraq War. Hatra was inscribed on the list in 2015 due to its reported extensive destruction by the Islamic State of Iraq and the Levant.

World Heritage Sites

Site; named after the World Heritage Committee's official designation
Location; at city, regional, or provincial level and geocoordinates
Criteria; as defined by the World Heritage Committee
Area; in hectares and acres. If available, the size of the buffer zone has been noted as well. A value of zero implies that no data has been published by UNESCO
Year; during which the site was inscribed to the World Heritage List
Description; brief information about the site, including reasons for qualifying as an endangered site, if applicable

Tentative list
In addition to sites inscribed on the World Heritage list, member states can maintain a list of tentative sites that they may consider for nomination. Nominations for the World Heritage list are only accepted if the site was previously listed on the tentative list. As of 2014, Iraq lists eleven properties on its tentative list:

Ur: The site was an important Sumerian city-state in ancient Mesopotamia, marked by the prominent Ziggurat of Ur.
Nimrud: The ancient city was considered the second capital of Assyria.
The Ancient City of Nineveh: Nineveh was one of the most important cultural centres in Antiquity and a former capital of the Neo-Assyrian Empire.
The Fortress of Al-Ukhaidar: Constructed during the 8th century, the uniquely styled fortress was an important stop on regional trade routes.
Wasit: Founded during the late 7th century, Wasit was a regional administrative centre.
The Marshlands of Mesopotamia: Situated around the confluence of the Tigris and Euphrates, the marshlands covered a vast area in southern Iraq and were home to hundreds of thousands, before they were gradually drained from the 1950s on and shrunk dramatically under Saddam Hussein.
The Site of Thilkifl: The site is traditionally believed to be the burial place of Ezekiel. It contains a shrine to the prophet, an Ottoman-era marketplace, and a number of khans.
Wadi Al-Salam Cemetery in Najaf: The cemetery in Najaf is among the largest in the world, containing the remains of Ali ibn Abi Talib and is regarded as holy by Muslims.
Amedy City: One of the oldest cities in the world, Amedy was successively ruled by the Medes, Assyrians, Parthians and Muslims.
Historical Features of the Tigris River in Baghdad Rusafa, which extends from the school Al-Mustansiriya to the Abbasid Palace: The Rusafa district of Baghdad contains a large amount of cultural heritage dating back to the Abbasid era, including Al-Mustansiriya University and the Abbasid Palace.

See also
List of World Heritage Sites in the Arab states

References

 
Iraq
World Heritage Sites
Landmarks in Iraq
World Heritage Sites